Revive (sometimes styled Rev!ve) was a Christian rock band based out of Atlanta, Georgia, which consisted of Dave Hanbury, Rich Thompson, Tyler Hall, and Michael Wright. Formed in 2004, they had success throughout Australia, releasing two albums, as well as supporting Third Day on a national tour in January 2007. The band then relocated to America to pursue their career in Christian music. In August 2009, it was announced that Tyler Hall would be leaving the band on 4 September.  He was replaced by Nevertheless guitarist, AJ Cheek. Revive was featured in the 2010 Winter Jam tour along with several other Christian artists and bands such as Tenth Avenue North, Third Day, Robert Pierre, The Newsboys and more. In the fall of 2010, Revive teamed up with Hawk Nelson, Britt Nicole, and John Reuben on the "Fly Me To The Show" Tour. On 25 October 2010, Mike Tenkate officially announced that he would be leaving the band at the end of 2010. With the start of 2011 the newest member Michael Wright out of Nashville came on board to fulfill the drumming position.  Shortly to follow came one of Revive's last national extents with Building429 on their "Listen to the Sound" tour with opening artist Anthem Lights.  

On 3 July 2011, Revive announced on their website that they had decided to finish their nearly 10-year-long adventure, and that they were saying farewell to the band.

Awards
Runner up for best Gospel song at the Oz Music Awards 2005
Nominated best Gospel group at the Australian Gospel Music Awards 2005
Runner up for best Gospel song at the Australian Gospel Music Aards 2005
WINNER best gospel video at the Australian Gospel Music Awards 2006
International Song writing competition finalist in 2005 and in 2007 for best Gospel song
2007 music Oz WINNER of Best Christian song Can't Change Yesterday.
2007 WINNER of Australian Gospel Music Awards for Best Rock Song These Days
Nominated for "New Artist of the Year" at 2010 Dove Awards

Discography

Albums

Singles

Trivia
The Song "Blink" was featured in the preview for the ABC Drama Rookie Blue
The Song "Something Glorious" was featured in the preview for ABC Drama Secret Millionaire 
The Song "Can't Change Yesterday" was featured on an episode of The Gospel Music Channel's Kitchen Sink.
The Song "Can't Change Yesterday" was also featured on the Australian version of Jamie's Kitchen.
Revive was listed as Billboard's list of bands to watch in 2009—the only Christian band on the list.
"The First Noel" single climbed as high as number 8 on the Christian AC Chart (01/08/2011).

References

External links
Revive's Official Website - website is no longer active

Australian Christian rock groups
Musical groups established in 2001
Essential Records (Christian) artists